Jean Giard (born 30 September 1936) is a French politician. He served as a Communist member of the National Assembly from 1986 to 1988, representing Isère.

References

1936 births
Living people
Politicians from Paris
French Communist Party politicians
Deputies of the 8th National Assembly of the French Fifth Republic